MKE Ankaragücü or fully Makina ve Kimya Endüstrisi Ankaragücü, is a Turkish sports club located in the city of Ankara. The football team wears a yellow and navy kit and plays its home matches at Eryaman Stadium following the closure of the Ankara 19 Mayıs.

The club's greatest domestic successes are the Turkish Football Championship title in 1949 and two Turkish Cups won in 1972 and 1981. They also won the second division on two occasions. Regionally, Ankaragücü have won six Ankara Football League titles. The club have a rivalry with Gençlerbirliği.

Ankaragücü also operate cycling, taekwondo, and women's volleyball departments. The women's volleyball team have competed in the Turkish Women's Volleyball League since the 2009–10 season.

History

Early years (1909–1959) 
Ankaragücü are based in Ankara, but were founded in Zeytinburnu, Istanbul in 1904 as Altınörs İdman Yurdu. The club competed in the Istanbul Friday League. It is unclear as to the motive behind the uprooting of the Istanbul-based club to Ankara. Another theory is that the club splintered, with some players following Şükrü Abbas and others following Agah Orhan. Şükrü Abbas founded Turan Sanatkarangücü in 1910. In 1938, both clubs merged to form AS-FA Gücü. The club name was changed for one last time in 1948, with both sides settling on Ankaragücü. Ankaragücü have won the former Turkish Football Championship in 1949, the greatest success in their history, and reached the third place before in 1924 under the name Anadolu Turan Sanatkarangücü.

1. Lig years and relegation (1959–1981) 
The club were one of the original sixteen clubs in the 1959 Turkish National League. They were admitted into the league after finishing second in the Ankara Professional League. The club finished fifth in the Beyaz Grup (White Group) in the first season of the Milli Lig.

Ankaragücü were relegated to the 2.Lig in 1967–68 after finishing second to last place. The club returned to the top league next season. Ankaragücü were again relegated in the 1975–76 season, but promoted to the 1st League next season. Ankaragücü was relegated for the third time in 1977–1978 season.

Back to 1. Lig (1981–2012) 
Ankaragücü returned to the 1st League in 1981 due to a political decision, towards which the FIFA was still powerless back then. The Turkish President Kenan Evren and Ankara governor Mustafa Gönül wanted a club from the capital in the 1. Lig and thus saw to that the club gained promotion despite only having finished second in the 2nd division, behind Sakaryaspor. Ankaragücü had won the Turkish Cup too. Ankaragücü has played in the 1st League since then. The club was occasionally successful during the 1990s.

Under Ersun Yanal's managership, the club has seen two successful seasons, becoming sixth in the 2000–01 season and fourth in the 2001–02 season. After Ersun Yanal left the club, Ankaragücü found it in a struggle to be saved from relegation each year and were in full-blown and widespread disarray. The club managed to stay clear of relegation at the last few matches during these years. Consequently, a financial crisis hit the club during the late 2000s.

After the economic crisis, Ahmet Gökçek became the chairman replacing Cemal Aydın. He promised that the club would become a champion in upcoming years. He was formerly (informally) associated with Ankaraspor and TFF objected to the control of two clubs at the same time and relegated Ankaraspor. After the relegation of Ankaraspor, he merged the football squads of two teams, but he did not manage to form a squad that would win a championship.

The congress in which Ahmet Gökçek was elected annulled by Turkish court and Cengiz Topel Yıldırım returned to the chairman position. Due to the economic crisis, Cengiz Topel Yıldırım sold key players of the squad and the team was one of the weakest teams of Turkish Super League. Sami Altınyuva became the next chairman but did not solve the financial problems. Due to the ongoing financial crisis, many players left the club. Later, Bent Ahlat, Atilla Süslü and Mehmet Yiğiner became chairmen but the financial problems were not solved.

Relegation again 
Due to financial crisis, the club relegated from Süper Lig in the 2011–2012 season and from PTT 1. Lig in the 2012–2013 season.

Going back up 
They returned to the TFF First League after being promoted from the third tier of Turkish football during the 2016–17 season. They got promoted back up to the Süper Lig the following season, where they currently remain. Ankaragücü  finished in the relegation zone in the 2019–2020 Süper Lig, but the Turkish Football Federation voided all relegation due to COVID-19.

Special relationship with Bursaspor 

In the early 1990s Bursaspor's ultra group Teksas had a leader called Abdulkerim Bayraktar. He went to study in Ankara, and whilst in the city he started attending Ankaragücü games and started building ties between the two clubs.

However, in 1993, his life was cut short as during his military service he was killed. This tragic event bought Bursaspor and Ankaragücü even closer together. During the first game after his death, Bursaspor organized a tribute to him, the events which happened next cemented the brotherhood between these two teams. A large group of Ankaragücü supporters made their way onto the pitch and unveiled a large banner reading, 'Our brother Abdul will never die, he lives on in our hearts'. The two supporter groups united and hundreds of Ankaragücü ultras attended his funeral. From that day on Bursaspor supporters would chant Ankaragücü's name in the sixth minute of every home game, number six being significant due to it being Ankara's city code.

Ankaragücü supporters in return chant Bursaspor's name during the 16th minute, 16 being Bursa's city code. When the two sides play, the supporters sit together, which is one of the rare occasions in which ultras from opposing teams watch a game together in a mixed environment, they bring "Bursankara" scarfs (a merger of the two clubs names) to the games and create a fantastic atmosphere full of mutual respect.

Stadium 

The club currently plays its home matches at Eryaman Stadium, opened in 2019. Ankaragücü's former home, the Ankara 19 Mayıs Stadium, was demolished in 2018. They also currently share the stadium with fellow-Ankara based club and rivals Gençlerbirliği.

Honours

National competitions 
Turkish Football Championship
Winners (1): 1949

Turkish Cup
Winners (2): 1971–72, 1980–81
Runners-up (3): 1972–73, 1981–82, 1990–91

Turkish Super Cup
Winners (1): 1981
Runners-up (1): 1972

TFF First League
Winners (3): 1968–69, 1976–77, 2021-2022

Regional competitions 
Ankara Football League
Winners (6): 1924, 1935–36, 1936–37, 1948–49, 1951–52, 1956–57

European participations 

UEFA Cup Winners' Cup:

UEFA Cup / UEFA Europa League:

Players

Current squad

Other players under contract

Out on loan

See also 
 List of Turkish sports clubs by foundation dates
Mechanical and Chemical Industry Corporation

Club Officials

References

External links 
Official website
Ankaragücü on TFF.org

 
Association football clubs established in 1910
Football clubs in Turkey
Women's volleyball teams in Turkey
1910 establishments in the Ottoman Empire
Süper Lig clubs
Sports teams in Ankara